State Route 517 (SR 517) is an east–west state highway located in the northeastern quadrant of the U.S. state of Ohio. The western terminus of State Route 517 is in downtown Lisbon at a signalized intersection that marks the confluence of U.S. Route 30, State Route 45, State Route 154 and State Route 164.

Established in the late 1930s, State Route 517 runs exclusively within Columbiana County, traversing through mainly rural terrain in the central and northeastern portions of the county.

Route description
State Route 517, which lies entirely within the northeastern portion of Columbiana County, is not included within the National Highway System, a network of routes deemed most important for the economy, mobility and defense of the nation.

History
Established in 1937 along the routing that it currently utilizes between downtown Lisbon and the junction of State Route 7 and State Route 558, State Route 517 has not experienced any major changes in alignment since its designation.

Major intersections

References

517
Transportation in Columbiana County, Ohio